Darnhill (or Darn Hill as recorded by the Ordnance Survey) is an area of Heywood, a town within the Metropolitan Borough of Rochdale, in Greater Manchester, England. In the 20th century, Darnhill was chosen as the location for a planned overspill housing estate for Manchester, to allievate quality housing shortages in that city. The Darnhill council estate is no longer overseen by Manchester City Council, but by the Guinness Trust Housing Association.

History
During World War II, Manchester was heavily bombed. Lacking space the Council bought land from neighbouring boroughs to build municipal housing for its bombed out residents. Although these estates were in boroughs outside of Manchester, residents still paid rent and rates to Manchester City Council. The Darnhill Estate began construction in the early 1960s with the first family moving in in 1962. Eventually 5000 people moved to the estate, mainly from the Collyhurst and Miles Platting area of the city

In 1998, after consultation with residents, Manchester City Council, transferred its interests in the Darnhill Estate to the Guinness Trust.

Geography
Darn Hill is located in the southwestern part of Heywood, between the River Roch (to the north) and East Lancs Railway (to the south). It is close to the Metropolitan Borough of Rochdale's boundary with the Metropolitan Borough of Bury.

Education
Our Ladys and St. Pauls RC is the only school on the estate at the present time. Darnhill Primary School was closed in 2007. Heywood Community High School closed on 31 June 2010.

References

Areas of the Metropolitan Borough of Rochdale
Manchester overspill estates
Heywood, Greater Manchester